The Tempestt Bledsoe Show (also called Tempestt) is an American daytime talk show presented by Tempestt Bledsoe which aired from 1995 to 1996.

Background
The series was a lighter take on another talk show that was produced Columbia/Tri-Star at the time, Ricki Lake, and as such focused on issues such as relationships, family issues, and the topics of the day. The series also aired on a majority of stations that also aired Ricki as a way to capitalize on attracting young adult and urban viewers, given Bledsoe and Lake being in their 20s. However, even with or without Lake's program as a lead-in or lead-out, Tempestt failed to win viewers over and was cancelled by June 1996.

References

External links

1995 American television series debuts
1996 American television series endings
First-run syndicated television programs in the United States
Television series by Dick Clark Productions
Television series by Sony Pictures Television
1990s American television talk shows